Napoleon Bonaparte Thistlewood (March 30, 1837 – September 15, 1915) was a veteran of the American Civil War who served as a U.S. Representative from the state of Illinois from 1908 and 1913.

Early life and career
Napoleon Thistlewood was born in Kent County, Delaware, near the town of Harrington. He attended the public schools in that area.  In 1858 he moved to Mason, Illinois, and engaged in mercantile pursuits.

Thistlewood served in the Union Army during the American Civil War.

After the war he returned to Mason and resumed business pursuits. He later moved to Cairo, Illinois, where he served two terms as that city's mayor, 1879-1883 and 1897-1901.

Military and government service
Thistlewood enlisted in the Union Army in 1862 and served as captain of Company C, Ninety-eighth Regiment, Illinois Volunteer Infantry. He served in the Army of the Cumberland, in Wilder's Brigade, and with Wilson's Cavalry Corps.

At the conclusion of his second mayoral term in Cairo, Thistlewood was named Department Commander of the Grand Army of the Republic for Illinois (1901).

Congress
Thistlewood was elected as a Republican to the Sixtieth Congress to fill the vacancy caused by the 1907 death of George W. Smith. He was elected to the Sixty-first and Sixty-second Congresses and served from February 1908 to March 1913. He was an unsuccessful candidate for reelection in 1912 to the Sixty-third Congress.

He retired and was a resident of Cairo, Illinois, until his death in that city on 15 September 1915.

Death
He died in Cairo in 1915. He was interred in Beech Grove Cemetery, Mounds, Illinois.

References
 Retrieved on 2008-02-15

1837 births
1915 deaths
People from Cairo, Illinois
Union Army officers
People of Illinois in the American Civil War
Mayors of places in Illinois
Republican Party members of the United States House of Representatives from Illinois
19th-century American politicians
People from Harrington, Delaware
Grand Army of the Republic officials